María Protópappa (born 5 May 1973 in Athens) is a retired Greek long-distance runner who mainly competed in the 5000 metres. She represented her country at the 2004 Summer Olympics without reaching the final.

Competition record

Personal bests
Outdoor
1500 metres – 4:10.51 (Bucharest 2002)
3000 metres – 8:59.49 (Haniá 2002)
5000 metres – 15:04.03 (Brussels 2006)
10,000 metres – 32:46.17 (Maribor 2004)
Indoor
3000 metres – 9:19.41 (Piraeus 2001)

References

1973 births
Living people
Greek female long-distance runners
Olympic athletes of Greece
Athletes (track and field) at the 2004 Summer Olympics
Athletes from Athens